Dubravka is a 1967 Soviet family film directed by Radomir Vasilevsky.

Plot 
The film tells about a girl who grandmother calls Dubravka. She plays football with other children, climbs trees and swims in the sea. But childhood ends and she enters adulthood. She wants to be alone, dream and think about life. And suddenly she falls in love for the first time in her life...

Cast 
 Lina Braknyte as Dubravka
 Nijolė Vikiraitė as Valentina
 Vitali Fadeyev as Pyotr Petrovich
 Kostya Usatov as Seryozhka
 Olga Anikina as Natashka
 Georgi Slabinyak as Ilya Fomich
 Sergey Tikhonov as Utyug
 Misha Chernysh as Zelyonka
 Alla Vitruk as Snow Queen

References

External links 
 

1967 films
1960s Russian-language films
Soviet children's films
Russian children's films
Films about children
Films set in Crimea